Roll Away is the debut album by the British blues rock power trio Back Door Slam. It was recorded with the classic lineup of Davey Knowles on guitar, Adam Jones on Bass and Ross Doyle on drums and released on 18 June 2007 in the Isle of Man, 1 July in the United States and 25 September 2007 in the United Kingdom, under Blix Street Records. The album incorporates predominantly blues-rock, with hints of Celtic music, folk rock and country rock (in "Too Good For Me", "Too Late", "Stay", "Roll Away").

Track listing
All songs written by Davy Knowles and arranged by Back Door Slam except where noted.
"Come Home" (arr. w/ Dan Clarke) – 4:18
"Heavy on My Mind" – 5:19
"Outside Woman Blues" (Blind Joe Reynolds) – 3:27
"Gotta Leave" – 5:49
"Stay" – 5:36
"Too Late" – 2:57
"Takes a Real Man" – 4:41
"It’ll All Come Around" – 3:56
"Too Good For Me" – 4:51
"Roll Away" – 3:34
"Real Man" (bonus track) – 4:07

Back Door Slam albums
2007 albums